Lakeside School is an elite private/independent school located in Seattle, Washington for grades 5–12. As of 2021, school review website Niche ranks Lakeside School the best private high school in Washington state and the 23rd best private high school in the United States.

History
Lakeside School was developed in 1919 by Frank G. Moran as Moran-Lakeside School on the shores of Lake Washington in the Denny-Blaine neighborhood of Seattle. Originally, the school was intended to feed students to Moran's other school, the Moran School on nearby Bainbridge Island. In 1923 the school was incorporated and renamed to Lakeside Day School. In 1923, it moved to the present site of The Bush School in Washington Park. In 1930, Lakeside moved to its newly constructed campus at its current location. It became coeducational upon merger with St. Nicholas School, a Capitol Hill private girls' school, in 1971.

Academics 
All courses at Lakeside are college preparatory, and although AP courses are not offered, the majority meet or exceed the rigor and depth of the AP curriculum. Honors courses are only available in science and math. Graduation requirements include 2 years of Arts, 4 years of English, 3 years of History, 3 years in either a foreign language offered (Chinese/French/Spanish/Latin) or 2 years in two foreign languages, 3 years of Math, 2 years of Physical Education, and 2 years of Science. Additionally students are required to participate in one week of Outdoor Education before graduation and perform 80 service hours (on average 146 hours reported per student), at least 60 of which must be off-campus.

Typically 100% of students go on to matriculate at four-year colleges, with 88% of graduates out-of-state.

Student life 
Lakeside has many student-initiated and led clubs, such as the Chess Team, the Acafellas and Bellas (male- and female-identifying a cappella groups, respectively), Quiz Bowl, Ethics Bowl, and Imago (a literary magazine). Other aspects of student life include the affinity groups, like BSU (Black Student Union), GLOW (Gay Lesbian Or Whatever, a gay-straight alliance club), LAPS (Lakeside Asian/Pacific Islander Students), MIXED (Multicultural Initiators EXperiencing and Encouraging Diversity), and LATISPA (a support network for Latin American students). The number and nature of clubs changes each year as student interests change.

Athletics 
A large program offers golf, football, soccer, volleyball, crew, wrestling, baseball, basketball, tennis, swimming, diving cross country, and track and field as well as a strength and conditioning program. In recent years, the boys' swim team won a 3A WIAA state championship in the 2011-2012 season as well as in the 2012-2013 season. The 2013-2014 boys' soccer team won the WIAA state championship in the 3A division. The 2014 girls' swim team won the 3A WIAA state championship for the first time in school history, and won the 2015 state championship as well. The 2016 volleyball team won the 3A WIAA state championship for the first time in school history. The 2021 girls' soccer team won the 3A WIAA state championship for the first time since 2003.

Global Service Learning 
Established in the summer of 2005, the school's Global Service Learning Program, commonly referred to as GSL, aims at helping students look at the world from a different point of view while helping the underprivileged around the world. In 2005, students visited India, Peru, and China; in the summer of 2006 students travelled to Peru, China, Morocco, and the Dominican Republic. In the summer of 2007, 86 Upper School students traveled to Peru, China, Morocco, India, and the Dominican Republic. This list grew to include Senegal as an option for the 2009 summer trips (removed in 2015 due to the Ebola virus epidemic in West Africa), Ecuador for the 2013 summer trips, Thailand for 2014, and the Dominican Republic for 2015. The Middle School opened its first Global Service Learning Program for seventh graders with trips to the Makah Indian Reservation on Neah Bay in the summer of 2006; it sent an eighth grade trip to Costa Rica every summer between 2007 and 2014.  It also began a trip for sixth graders to Broetje Orchards in the summer of 2010. In 2015, it implemented week long GSL trips around the Pacific Northwest for 8th graders. Students visited Cloud View Farms, the Quinault Reservation, Vernonia, Elwha, the Makah Reservation and Broetje Orchards.

The Global Service Learning Program is one piece of a broad change in curriculum and administrative policies aimed at increasing diversity. The school has focused on, in recent years, its role as an elite prep school and its desire for diverse viewpoints and backgrounds of its curriculum, faculty, and students.

Lakeside students have the opportunity to study abroad during their junior year of high school through schools called School Year Abroad, the Mountain School, the High Mountain Institute, the Maine Coast Semester, and CityTerm. Students may apply in the winter of their sophomore year to spend part of their junior year at one of these schools.

Lakeside has a long tradition in engaging students in global affairs. In 1984, Lakeside students competed against students at Moscow School #20 in a chess match relayed by Telex. The event was one of the first of its kind. A yearly exchange program with Moscow School #20 began in 1986, the first such regular American-Soviet school exchange in the country. Since 1984, the schools have been sister schools.

School traditions 
Lakeside has many classic traditions and special events, including May Day (organized by Student Government) Convocation, dances and Arts Fest.

Newer traditions include advisory and regular community dialogues. Advisory groups meet several times a week and are a space for students to build connections with each other and their faculty advisor. Regular community dialogue is a tradition that gives all Upper School students a chance to discuss challenging topics like race, religion, and gender in small groups with trained facilitators.

Lakeside also has several traditional fundraising events. ROAR (Raising Our Allocation Resources), is an annual celebration of the Lakeside community and the primary fundraiser of the Parents and Guardians Association. The Rummage sale, held once or twice yearly since 1950, has also raised money for the school, through donations of used items to be sold to the community.

Notable alumni
Wilber Huston, (class of 1929), NASA mission director, Edison Scholar.
David "Ned" Skinner, (class of 1937), former owner of Seattle Space Needle and the Seattle Seahawks.
Adam West (class of 1946), American film actor, played the original role of Batman in the 1960s TV Series.
Charles Pigott (class of 1947), Chairman and CEO of Paccar 1967-1996.
Booth Gardner, (class of 1954), Governor of Washington state; Chair of National Governors Association.
Craig McCaw (class of 1967), founder of McCaw Cellular (now part of AT&T Mobility) and Clearwire Corporation.
Tor Seidler, (class of 1968), author of "A Rat's Tale", "Mean Margaret" and "Gully's Travels".
Frederic Moll (class of 1969), co-founder of Intuitive Surgical, Hansen Medical, Mako Surgical, and Auris Surgical Robots.
Paul Allen (class of 1971), co-founder of Microsoft and Vulcan Inc.
Ric Weiland (class of 1971), computer software pioneer, programmer and LGBT philanthropist.
Bill Gates (class of 1973), co-founder of Microsoft and the Bill & Melinda Gates Foundation.
Maria Eitel (class of 1980), first president of the Nike Foundation.
Annie Leonard, (class of 1982), Executive Director of Greenpeace USA.
 Tom Lee, (class of 1986), CEO Galileo Health, former founder, CEO at One Medical.
Christopher Miller (class of 1993), American film director, writer, and producer (How I Met Your Mother, The Lego Movie, and the Jump Street franchise).
Seth Gordon, (class of 1994), American film director, producer, screenwriter, and film editor (The King of Kong: A Fistful of Quarters, Four Christmases, Freakonomics, Horrible Bosses, Undefeated, Identity Thief, Baywatch).
Marjorie Liu, (class of 1996), author and comic book writer (Monstress, NYX, X-23, Dark Wolverine, Astonishing X-Men).
Duncan Atwood, Javelin thrower who qualified for the 1980 and 1984 Olympics.
Freddie Wong, (class of 2004), filmmaker, musician, VFX artist and competitive gamer.
Daniel Kan, (class of 2005), entrepreneur and founder and COO of Cruise Automation (acquired by General Motors for $1b).
Royce David, (class of 2017), multi-platinum music producer.
Lauren Selig (class of 1994) Film producer, entrepreneur and investor (Hacksaw Ridge, Lone Survivor, American Made). Daughter of Martin Selig.
Corbin Carroll, (class of 2019), baseball player, drafted as the 16th overall pick of the 2019 MLB Draft.
 Adam Selipsky, (class of 1984), CEO of Amazon Web Services and former Tableau Software CEO.

References

External links
Lakeside School website
Lakeside Archives

Schools in Seattle
Private high schools in Washington (state)
High schools in King County, Washington
Educational institutions established in 1914
Private middle schools in Washington (state)
1914 establishments in Washington (state)

sv:Bill Gates#Biografi